Kwon Jeong Saeng (September 10, 1937 – May 17, 2007) was a South Korean writer.

Life
Kwon Jeong Saeng was born Kwon Gyeongsu in Tokyo, Japan in 1937.  Shortly after the Liberation in 1946, he returned to Korea. Because he was extremely poor, Kwon never received a formal education, instead traveling Korea while working as a clerk, and sometimes resorting to betting to support himself. In 1967 Kwon settled in Andong, Gyeongsangbuk-do as a church caretaker. His first publication, “Puppy Poo” appeared in 1969 in Christian Education; in 1971, his story “Lamb’s Shadow Ttallangi” was chosen as one of the winners of a spring literary contest sponsored by Daegu Maeil Sinmun, and in 1973, “Mommy and Cotton Jacket” was selected by Chosun Ilbo for its literary contest.

Kwon fell ill in his later years, and made a will that left all of his royalties to charities, including some in North Korea, Asia, and Africa. He also requested that his cottage be destroyed, or left to nature, and wanted his body cremated and spread on the mountains behind his home.

Work

The Literature Translation Institute of Korea summarizes Kown's work:

  

In 1996, Kwon's work "Puppy Poo" was turned into a successful children's picture book.

Awards
 1995 New Bud Literary Award
 1975 Korean Children's Literature Award
 1969 Christian Children's Literature Award

Works in Korean (Partial)
Children's books
 Hantijae Sky (
 Jeomdeuk's House (
 Sister Mongsil (
 God's Tears (
 Seaside Children (
 The Moon in Apple Orchard (
 Black Boa Train (
 Moon World Ttolbae Has Seen (
 Traditional Tales for North and South Korean Children (
Essays
 Our God (
 For the Youthful Wanderer (.

References 

1937 births
Korean writers
2007 deaths